is a Japanese individual rhythmic gymnast.

Career 
She represents her nation at international competitions. She participated at the 2000 Summer Olympics in Sydney and the 2004 Summer Olympics in Athens. She also competed at world championships, including at the 2005 World Rhythmic Gymnastics Championships.

References

External links
Profile at WeAreGymnastics

1981 births
Living people
Japanese rhythmic gymnasts
People from Hyōgo Prefecture
Sportspeople from Hyōgo Prefecture
Gymnasts at the 2004 Summer Olympics
Olympic gymnasts of Japan
Gymnasts at the 2000 Summer Olympics
Gymnasts at the 1998 Asian Games
Gymnasts at the 2002 Asian Games
Gymnasts at the 2006 Asian Games
Asian Games medalists in gymnastics
Asian Games silver medalists for Japan
Asian Games bronze medalists for Japan
Medalists at the 1998 Asian Games
Medalists at the 2002 Asian Games
Medalists at the 2006 Asian Games
Competitors at the 2001 World Games
21st-century Japanese women